Universal Creighton Charter School is a historic school located in the Crescentville neighborhood of Philadelphia, Pennsylvania. It is currently in use as a charter school. The building was designed by Irwin T. Catharine and built in 1929–1930. It is a three-story, eight-bay, brick building on a raised basement in the Late Gothic Revival style. Additions were built in 1931 and 1954. It features entrances with arched stone surrounds, brick piers with terra cotta capitals, and a crenellated battlement with four small towers.

The building was added to the National Register of Historic Places in 1988 as the Thomas Creighton School.

References

External links

School buildings on the National Register of Historic Places in Philadelphia
Gothic Revival architecture in Pennsylvania
School buildings completed in 1930
Northeast Philadelphia
Charter schools in Pennsylvania
1930 establishments in Pennsylvania
Late Gothic Revival architecture